The common fibular nerve (also known as the common peroneal nerve, external popliteal nerve, or lateral popliteal nerve) is a nerve in the lower leg that provides sensation over the posterolateral part of the leg and the knee joint. It divides at the knee into two terminal branches: the superficial fibular nerve and deep fibular nerve, which innervate the muscles of the lateral and anterior compartments of the leg respectively. When the common fibular nerve is damaged or compressed, foot drop can ensue.

Structure
The common fibular nerve is the smaller terminal branch of the sciatic nerve. The common fibular nerve has root values of L4, L5, S1, and S2. It arises from the superior angle of the popliteal fossa and extends to the lateral angle of the popliteal fossa, along the medial border of the biceps femoris. It then winds around the neck of the fibula to pierce the fibularis longus and divides into terminal branches of the superficial fibular nerve and the deep fibular nerve. Before its division, the common fibular nerve gives off several branches in the popliteal fossa.

Cutaneous branches
 Lateral sural cutaneous nerve (lateral cutaneous nerve of calf) - supplies the skin of the upper two-thirds of the lateral side of leg.
 sural communicating nerve - it runs on the posterolateral aspect of the calf and joins the sural nerve.

Articular branches
 Superior lateral genicular nerve - accompanies artery of the same name and lies above the lateral femoral condyle.
 Inferior lateral genicular nerve - accompanies artery of the same name and lies just above the head of the fibula.
 Recurrent genicular nerve - It arises from the point of division of the common fibular nerve; then ascends anterior to the knee joint together with the anterior recurrent tibial artery to supply the knee joint and the tibialis anterior muscle.

Motor branches
There is only one motor branch that arises directly from the common fibular nerve, the nerve to the short head of the biceps femoris muscle.

Function
The common fibular nerve innervates the short head of the biceps femoris muscle via a motor branch that exits close to the gluteal cleft. The remainder of the fibular-innervated muscles are innervated by its branches, the deep fibular nerve and superficial fibular nerve.

It provides sensory innervation to the skin over the upper third of the lateral aspect of the leg via the lateral sural cutaneous nerve. It gives the aural communicating nerve which joins the sural nerve in the midcalf.

Clinical significance
Chronic fibular (peroneal) neuropathy can result from, among other conditions, bed rest of long duration, hyperflexion of the knee, peripheral neuropathy, pressure in obstetric stirrups, and conditioning in ballet dancers. The most common cause is habitual leg crossing that compresses the common fibular nerve as it crosses around the neck of the fibula.  Transient trauma to the nerve can result from peroneal strike.

Damage to this nerve typically results in foot drop, where dorsiflexion of the foot is compromised and the foot drags (the toe points) during walking; and in sensory loss to the dorsal surface of the foot and portions of the anterior, lower-lateral leg. A common yoga kneeling exercise, the Vajrasana, has been linked to a variant called  yoga foot drop.

Surgical procedures involving the nerve involve:

 fibular (peroneal) nerve decompression
 To surgically decompress the common fibular nerve, an incision is made over the neck of the fibula. Fascia surrounding the nerves to the lateral side of the leg is released.

 Deep fibular (peroneal) nerve decompression
 In the surgical treatment of deep fibular nerve entrapment in the foot, a ligament from the extensor digitorum brevis muscle that crosses over the deep fibular nerve, putting pressure on it and causing pain, is released.

Autopsy 

Anatomists are taught not to divide this nerve during its revealing. (Considering the fact that the most of them exploit this knowledge during their surgical praxis.)

Additional images

See also 

Deep fibular nerve
Superficial fibular nerve
Peroneal strike
Fibular veins
Fibular muscles

References

External links
 
 
 
  arteries-nerves%20LE/nerves4 at the Dartmouth Medical School's Department of Anatomy
 Overview at okstate.edu

Nerves of the lower limb and lower torso